Pozlovice is a market town in Zlín District in the Zlín Region of the Czech Republic. It has about 1,300 inhabitants.

Twin towns – sister cities

Pozlovice is twinned with:
 Rajecké Teplice, Slovakia

References

Populated places in Zlín District
Market towns in the Czech Republic